The  Ruby G. Ford  was a Chesapeake Bay skipjack, built in 1891 at Fairmount, Maryland. She was a  two-sail bateau, or "V"-bottomed deadrise type of centerboard sloop. She was one of the 35 surviving traditional Chesapeake Bay skipjacks and a member of the last commercial sailing fleet in the United States.

According to a first-hand account by Christopher White in his book Skipjack, pp. 292–296, St. Martin's Press, published in 2009, the Ruby G. Ford was burned to complete destruction, torched by Captain Bart Murphy, who owned her at the time and did not have funds enough to restore her from a state of grave disrepair.

She was listed on the National Register of Historic Places in 1985.

References

External links
RUBY G. FORD (skipjack), Talbot County, including photo in 1984, at Maryland Historical Trust

Ships in Talbot County, Maryland
Skipjacks
Ships on the National Register of Historic Places in Maryland
1891 ships
National Register of Historic Places in Talbot County, Maryland